Dominique O'Neal Jones (born October 15, 1988) is an American professional basketball player for the Jilin Northeast Tigers of the Chinese Basketball Association (CBA). A noted scorer in college, Jones had the second-highest scoring average in the Big East Conference during the 2009–10 season.

College career

Freshman 
Jones entered USF and started every game during his first season. He scored 17.1 points per game with 4.6 rebounds and 2.8 assists.

Sophomore 
In Jones's second season, the sophomore improved his scoring (18.1), rebounds (5.6) and assists (3.9) averages.

Junior 
Prior to the 2009–2010 season, Jones was named to the preseason All Big East team. Over the season, he averaged 21.4 points while also grabbing 6.1 rebounds and giving 3.6 assists. He scored a season high 46 points in a 109–105 win over the Providence Friars. USF went 20–13 and Jones was named to the 1st team All-Big East team. He led the team with the most points in a game.

Professional career 

He was selected by the Memphis Grizzlies with the 25th overall pick in the 2010 NBA Draft. The Grizzlies traded his rights to the Dallas Mavericks for cash considerations, reported to be around $3 million.

On November 30, 2010, the Mavericks assigned Jones to the Texas Legends of the NBA D-League, only to be called up early January 2011 after an injury to Caron Butler. He scored nine points in his return, in a 104–95 Dallas win over the Cleveland Cavaliers. A foot injury sidelined him for much of the season after averaging 2.3 points in 18 games. At the end of the season, the Mavericks would win the 2011 NBA Finals.

On January 15, 2012, Dallas assigned Jones to the D-League again. He would be recalled a week later. On February 19, 2012, Jones made his first career three-point field goal against the New York Knicks. On March 10, 2012, Jones recorded his first career start in an 87–111 loss to the Golden State Warriors.

In October 2012, the Mavericks opted not to pick up the team option for the next season in Jones's rookie contract. Jones was waived on March 9, 2013. On March 19, he was acquired by the Springfield Armor of the NBA D-League.

He joined the Milwaukee Bucks for the 2013 NBA Summer League. In September 2013, he joined the Liaoning Flying Leopards of the Chinese Basketball Association for the 2013–14 season.

On October 11, 2014, he signed with the Jilin Northeast Tigers for the 2014–15 CBA season. Following the CBA season, he signed with Atenienses de Manatí on March 18 for the rest of the 2015 BSN season.

On July 8, 2015, Jones returned to China and signed with Shanxi Zhongyu. In December 2015, he parted ways with Shanxi.

On August 23, 2016, Jones signed with Qingdao DoubleStar for the 2016–17 CBA season.

On August 11, 2017, Jones signed with Nanjing Monkey King of the Chinese Basketball Association. On December 12, 2017, he was waived by the Nanjing Monkey King.

On January 11, 2018, Jones signed with Petrochimi Bandar Imam of the Iranian Super League.

On August 7, 2018, Jones signed with the Jilin Northeast Tigers of the Chinese Basketball Association (CBA).

The Basketball Tournament 
In 2017, Jones competed in The Basketball Tournament with the Tampa Bulls, a team made up of USF alumni. Jones' team made it to the Sweet 16 where they were eliminated by eventual champions Overseas Elite. Jones led the team with 28.3 PPG during the tournament.

Career statistics

NBA 

|-
| align="left" style="background:#afe6ba;" | †
| align="left" | Dallas
| 18 || 0 || 7.5 || .311 || .000 || .824 || 1.4 || 1.1 || .3 || .2 || 2.3
|-
| align="left" | 
| align="left" | Dallas
| 33 || 1 || 8.1 || .397 || .125 || .784 || 1.3 || 1.3 || .3 || .2 || 2.7
|-
| align="left" | 
| align="left" | Dallas
| 29 || 3 || 11.7 || .367 || .111 || .660 || 1.6 || 2.9 || .5 || .1 || 4.0
|-
| align="left" | Career
| align="left" |
| 80 || 4 || 9.3 || .366 || .095 || .729 || 1.4 || 1.8 || .4 || .1 || 3.1

CBA 

|-
| align="left" | 2013–14
| align="left" | Liaoning Flying Leopards
| 38 || 33 || 35.3 || .473 || .278 || .759 || 5.5 || 6.0 || 2.4 || 0.3 || 24.6
|-
| align="left" | 2014–15
| align="left" | Jilin Northeast Tigers
| 41 || 37 || 40.8 || .480 || .329 || .752 || 7.8 || 8.4 || 2.7 || 0.5 || 36.8
|-
| align="left" | 2015–16
| align="left" | Shanxi Brave Dragons
| 18 || 16 || 41.8 || .450 || .275 || .777 || 8.6 || 7.4 || 3.0 || 0.3 || 32.8
|-
| align="left" | 2016–17
| align="left" | Qingdao Eagles
| 37 || 37 || 39.2 || .486 || .296 || .739 || 8.2 || 6.2 || 1.6 || 0.5 || 30.2
|-
| align="left" | 2017–18
| align="left" | Nanjing Monkey Kings
| 14 || 14 || 34.4 || .461 || .260 || .838 || 6.9 || 5.3 || 1.0 || 0.4 || 28.9
|-
| align="left" | 2018–19
| align="left" | Jilin Northeast Tigers
| 46 || 46 || 34.5 || .498 || .302 || .780 || 7.5 || 8.1 || 1.8 || 0.6 || 28.3
|-
| align="left" | 2019–20
| align="left" | Jilin Northeast Tigers
| 28 || 28 || 39.8 || .467 || .283 || .806 || 8.3 || 8.9 || 2.0 || 0.6 || 37.8
|-
| align="left" | 2020–21
| align="left" | Jilin Northeast Tigers
| 37 || 37 || 40.2 || .459 || .261 || .736 || 10.9 || 9.5 || 2.2 || 0.6 || 38.2
|-
| align="left" | 2021–22
| align="left" | Jilin Northeast Tigers
| 25 || 25 || 38.8 || .445 || .255 || .763 || 10.0 || 9.0 || 2.4 || 1.1 || 26.5

Personal life 
Jones' forearms are tattooed with the words "Hustler" and "Survivor". After the Mavericks won the 2011 NBA Finals, Jones then proceeded to get a tattoo on his neck of the Larry O'Brien Championship Trophy, commemorating his team's victory.

References

External links 

Dominique Jones at FIBA.com
Dominique Jones at basketball-stats.de

1988 births
Living people
American expatriate basketball people in China
American expatriate basketball people in Iran
American men's 3x3 basketball players
American men's basketball players
Basketball players at the 2019 Pan American Games
Pan American Games 3x3 basketball players
Basketball players from Florida
Dallas Mavericks players
Nanjing Tongxi Monkey Kings players
Jilin Northeast Tigers players
Liaoning Flying Leopards players
Medalists at the 2019 Pan American Games
Memphis Grizzlies draft picks
Pan American Games gold medalists for the United States
Pan American Games medalists in basketball
People from Lake Wales, Florida
Petrochimi Bandar Imam BC players
Point guards
Qingdao Eagles players
Shanxi Loongs players
Shooting guards
South Florida Bulls men's basketball players
Sportspeople from Polk County, Florida
Springfield Armor players
Texas Legends players